The 2023 European Le Mans Series will be the twentieth season of the Automobile Club de l'Ouest's (ACO) European Le Mans Series. The six-event season will begin at Circuit de Barcelona-Catalunya on 23 April and will finish at Algarve International Circuit on 15 October.

The series is open to Le Mans Prototypes, divided into the LMP2 and LMP3 classes, and grand tourer-style racing cars in the LMGTE class. The season will be the last for the LMGTE class.

Calendar
The provisional calendar for the 2023 season was announced on 22 September 2022. MotorLand Aragón was added to the calendar for the first time, replacing the round at Monza, which left after serving as a late replacement for the Hungaroring during the 2022 season. The Portimão round was later postponed one week to alleviate a clash with the 2023 Petit Le Mans.

Entries

LMP2 
All cars in the LMP2 class use the Gibson GK428 V8 engine and Goodyear tyres. Entries in the LMP2 Pro-Am Cup, set aside for teams with a Bronze-rated driver in their line-up, are denoted with Icons.

LMP3
All cars in the LMP3 class use the Nissan VK56DE 5.6L V8 engine and Michelin tyres.

LMGTE 
All cars in the LMGTE class use Goodyear tyres.

Notes

References

External links
 

European Le Mans Series seasons
European Le Mans Series
European Le Mans Series
Le Mans Series